Jetty Road in Glenelg is a major tourism and retail precinct in Adelaide, South Australia. Starting from Brighton Road, it is almost 1 kilometre long. At its western end is Moseley Square and the popular Glenelg beachfront.

The Glenelg tram line runs along the road, with stops at either end and in the middle. The tram runs from the Glenelg beach to the city of Adelaide, shops at both end. Jetty Road is the only road in Adelaide to have a tramline covering its entire length.

References 

Roads in Adelaide